Karl-Werner Schulte (born 8 June 1946 in Warstein, North Rhine-Westphalia, Germany) is a German Professor of Real Estate at the IREBS International Real Estate Business School, University of Regensburg and was Founder and Academic Director of the IREBS Real Estate Academy, formerly EBS Real Estate Academy.

Life 
He studied Business Administration at the University of Muenster and graduated 1970 as "Diplom-Kaufmann" (MBA or MSc Business equivalent). In 1974 he was awarded a Doctoral Degree (Dr. rer.pol.) and promoted to Senior Lecturer and some years later to Reader at the University of Muenster. In 1986 he was appointed Professor of Investment & Finance at the EBS European Business School, located near Frankfurt.

In 1990 Karl-Werner Schulte and his wife Dr. Gisela Schulte-Daxbök founded the EBS Real Estate Academy, the first institution in Germany which offered executive education for real estate practitioners. Schulte was academic director for about 15 years. In 1992 the executive part time course in Real Estate became the first course which the RICS Royal Institution of Chartered Surveyors accredited in Continental Europe. In 1994 he raised funds from leading real estate firms in Europe for an Endowed Chair of Real Estate which he took over. He established real estate as a major in the "Diplom-Kaufmann" degree course to become the first course with this specification worldwide which received RICS accreditation. By the appointment of further professors the Department of Real Estate was established and led by him for several years.
In 2006 the Department of Real Estate (nearly all professors and donors) and the Real Estate Academy  moved to the University of Regensburg where Karl-Werner Schulte initiated the IREBS International Real Estate Business School  and became the holder of the ECE Endowed Professorship and the Academic Director of the IREBS Real Estate Academy. When he retired in 2011 the IREBS International Real Estate Business School had developed into one of the leading academic real estate centers worldwide.

Karl-Werner Schulte still plays an active role in real estate education and research at IREBS. He is the Founder and Academic Director of the Center for African Real Estate Research and the co-founder and chairman of the Board of Trustees of the homonymous non-profit Foundation (www.afrer.org) which supports doctoral and master students as well as the development of real estate departments at universities in African countries. The research center and the foundation collaborate with the African Real Estate Society which is part of the IRES International Real Estate Society network.
On the occasion of his 70th birthday in 2016 the ERES European Real Estate Society held its Annual Conference at the University of Regensburg and the IREBS International Real Estate Business School honoured him with the symposium "Real Estate Research & Practice - Past, Present and Future".

Role in the Real Estate Industry 
Schulte is founder or co-founder of some organizations of the real estate industry:

- GIF Society of Property Researchers, Germany
- ERES European Real Estate Society
- ULI Urban Land Institute German Chapter
- IPD Germany, formerly DID German Property Databank, today part of MSCI
- ICG Initiative Corporate Governance of the German Real Industry 
- WVFI Scientic Society for the Promotion of Real Estate Journalism 
Furthermore, he worked as consultant and served in supervisory boards and advisory boards of well-known real estate companies and organizations. He was the first German to be elected Honorary Member of the RICS Royal Institution of Chartered Surveyors and Member of CRE Counselors of Real Estate.

Functions in Academic Organizations 
 Founding President of GIF Society of Property Researchers, Germany
 President of the ERES European Real Estate Society
 President of the IRES International Real Estate Society
 Board Member of the AfRES African Real Estate Society
He has been Editor of the "Zeitschrift für Immobilienökonomie" (now "German Journal of Real Estate Research") published by GIF, for nearly a decade and was or still is Member of the editorial board of several international academic real estate journals.

PhD Graduates in Professor Positions
Karl-Werner Schulte has supervised around 75 PhD students seventeen of which have been appointed Professors at German Universities:

 Jenny Arens, Duale Hochschule Baden-Württemberg
 Stephan Bone-Winkel, Universität Regensburg
 Petra Brockhoff, Universität Duisburg-Essen
 Christian Focke, Hochschule Aschaffenburg
 Michael Hauer, Hochschule Amberg-Weiden
 Kerstin H. Hennig, EBS Universität für Wirtschaft und Recht
 Gerrit Leopoldsberger, Hochschule für Wirtschaft und Umwelt Nürtingen-Geislingen
 Ulrich Nack, EBZ Business School
 Andrea Pelzeter, Hochschule für Wirtschaft und Recht Berlin
 Jeannette Raethel, Hochschule für Wirtschaft und Recht Berlin
 Verena Rock, Hochschule Aschaffenburg
 Nico B. Rottke, EBS Universität für Wirtschaft und Recht
 Wolfgang Schäfers, Universität Regensburg
 Peter Schaubach, EBS Universität für Wirtschaft und Recht
 Ramon Sotelo, Bauhaus-Universität Weimar
 Matthias Thomas, EBS Universität für Wirtschaft und Recht
 Rolf Tilmes, EBS Universität für Wirtschaft und Recht

Awards 
Karl-Werner Schulte received numerous awards. He is the only person who obtained in the lifetime all three IRES Awards.
 1999: International Real Estate Society (IRES) Service Award
 2001: European Real Estate Society (ERES) Achievement Award
 2005: Award of Excellence des German Council of Shopping Centers e.V.
 2008: ULI Germany Leadership Award
 2009: Immobilienmanager Lifetime Award
 2011: Pioneer Award, American Real Estate Society (ARES)
 2011: American Real Estate Society (ARES) Pioneer Award
 2011: Auszeichnung „Köpfe 2011“ des Fachmagazins Immobilienwirtschaft als einer von zwölf Managern der Immobilienwirtschaft
 2013: International Real Estate Society (IRES) Corporate Leadership Award for the IREBS Foundation for African Real Estate Research
 2013: ERES Honorary Membership
 2015: Chief of the African Real Estate Society (AfRES)
 2016: International Real Estate Society (IRES) Achievement Award
 2016: IRES Special Recognition Award

Honorary Memberships 
Furthermore, Karl-Werner Schulte was appointed Honorary Member by Institutions, Organizations and Societies:
 RICS Royal Institution of Chartered Surveyors (HonRICS)
 FPSB Financial Planning Standards Board (HonCFP)
 Alumni Organizations IMMOEBS and IREBSCORE
 GIF Society of Property Researchers,  Germany
 ERES European Real Estate Society
 AfRES African Real Estate Society
 Alumni Ardhi University, Tanzania
 University of Regensburg .

Publications 
Karl-Werner Schulte authored and edited more than 20 monographs, mostly in German language and has written numerous articles in academic and practitioners' journals.
Only his most important authorships and editorships in English language are cited here.

As an author 
 Karl-Werner Schulte: Optimale Nutzungsdauer und optimaler Ersatzzeitpunkt bei Entnahmemaximierung. Schriften zur wirtschaftswissenschaftlichen Forschung. Band 89. Anton Hain Verlag, Meisenheim 1975.  (Zugleich Münster, Dissertationsschrift).
 Karl-Werner Schulte: Wirtschaftlichkeitsrechnung. Physica-Verlag, 1. Auflage Würzburg 1978. .; 4. Auflage 1986. .
 Karl-Werner Schulte: Aktienrechtliche Rechnungslegung im Spiegel der Geschäftsberichte, Physica-Verlag, Würzburg 1984.
 Karl-Werner Schulte: Bilanzpolitik und Publizitätsverhalten deutscher Aktiengesellschaften - Derzeitige Praxis und erwartete Auswirkungen des Bilanzrichtlinien-Gesetzes, Verlag Eul, Bergisch Gladbach 1986.

As an editor 
 Immobilienökonomie
 Bd. 1: Betriebswirtschaftliche Grundlagen. 5. Aufl. De Gruyter Oldenbourg, Berlin/Boston 2016, .(die 5. Auflage zusammen mit Stephan Bone-Winkel und Wolfgang Schäfers).
 Bd. 2: Rechtliche Grundlagen. 3. Aufl. Oldenbourg, München 2013, .
 Bd. 3: Stadtplanerische Grundlagen. 2. Aufl. Oldenbourg, München 2012, .
 Bd. 4: Volkswirtschaftliche Grundlagen. Oldenbourg, München 2008, .
 Real Estate Education Throughout the World. Past, Present and Future. Sponsored by EBS and ARES. Kluwer, Boston 2002,  (Nachdruck 2013).

References

External links 
 
 Homepage der IREBS Immobilienakademie
 Homepage der Honorar-Professur für Immobilienwirtschaft an der Universität Regensburg
 IREBS Foundation for African Real Estate Research
 AfRES African Real Estate Society

1946 births
Living people
People from Warstein
University of Münster alumni
Academic staff of the University of Regensburg